Irina Podgorny, Ph.D (born 1963) is an Argentine anthropologist, a historian of science at the National University of La Plata, permanent staff at CONICET, professor ad honorem and Director of the Archive of History and Photographs at the Natural Science Facility and Museum of the National University of La Plata, and winner of the Bernardo Houssay Young Researcher Award. She has held numerous professorships and scholarships and has worked for CONICET since 2013.

Life
Irina Podgorny was born in Quilmes, Argentina in 1963. She studied anthropology in La Plata from 1981 to 1987 and then began graduate studies in Social History and History of Ideas at the University of Buenos Aires in 1988, passing in 1993. The next year, she was awarded her Ph.D in anthropology via her thesis. From 2001 to 2012, Podgorny was Professor of History of Science at the University of Quilmes.

In 2002-03, Podgorny was awarded the fellowship of the Humboldt Foundation with Friedrich Kittler and then worked as a visiting scholar in Berlin in 1998 (and again in 2009-11), Paris in 1999, and New York City in 2010. Podgorny has been a visiting professor in Rio de Janeiro from 2000–01, Paris in 2008, at EHESS in 2010, and held the Lewis P. Jones Professorship at Wofford College in South Carolina in 2012.

Since 2013, Podgorny has been a director of a binational research program between CONICET and Université Paris Diderot.

Bibliography

Books

 Arqueología y Educación: la inclusión de la arqueología pampeana en la educación argentina, 1993
 
 El argentino despertar de las faunas y de las gentes prehistóricas. Coleccionistas, Museos y estudiosos en la Argentina entre 1880 y 1910, 1999. Argentine Society of Anthropology
 El Argentino despertar de las faunas y de las gentes prehistóricas. Coleccionistas, estudiosos, museos y universidad en la creación del patrimonio paleontológico y arqueológico nacional (1875-1913), 2000. University of Buenos Aires Press

Articles

Citations

References

Articles

External links

 
 

1963 births
Argentine women scientists
Living people